Hand. Cannot. Erase. is the fourth solo studio album by English musician Steven Wilson. The album was released on 27 February 2015 through Kscope.

Writing and recording
The album was recorded in September 2014 at AIR Studios, London, UK. All band members of the previous album are also featured on the new recording. When discussing the lack of Theo Travis's input on the record, Steven Wilson described the album as less "jazzy" in comparison to the previous album, featuring only a few parts written for flutes and saxophones. Wilson also described the album as more reflective of all of the different material in his back catalogue, featuring elements of electronic music and straightforward pop songs alongside long progressive-oriented tracks. Alongside Wilson, the album features Ninet Tayeb on vocals, and the sequences featuring boy choristers is inspired by the track 'All of the Love', from The Dreaming, an album by Kate Bush.

Themes and concept
According to Wilson, the album is written from a female perspective, and the concept and story are inspired by the case of Joyce Carol Vincent, where a woman living in a large city dies in her apartment and no one misses her for over two years, despite her having family and friends. Wilson explained:
"The basic story, or concept of the record – it's about a woman growing up, who goes to live in the city, very isolated, and she disappears one day and no one notices. There's more to it than that. Now, what's really interesting about this story is that your initial reaction when you hear a story like that is, 'Ah, little old bag lady that no one notices, no one cares about.' [Vincent] wasn't [like that]. She was young, she was popular, she was attractive, she had many friends, she had family, but for whatever reason, nobody missed her for three years."

Release and promotion
The album was released in February 2015. A deluxe version of the album was also made available as well. Wilson and his band embarked on a tour through the UK and Europe in March and April 2015 in support of the album, with a setlist that was "based around the new album, of course, as well as casting the net further back into [his] past for a few surprises."

Music from the album started being released to the public in January 2015, when a teaser trailer was released online, accompanied with a link to a blog written by the album's main character – a reclusive artist who writes about her interest in people who go missing and her talent for hiding in public. On 4 February 2015 a video for "Perfect Life" was released via Wilson's official YouTube channel.

Critical reception

Hand. Cannot. Erase. received acclaim from critics. Metacritic, a review aggregator, gave the album a weighted average rating of 89 out of 100,  indicating universal acclaim, based on reviews from 8 critics. The Guardian rated the album five stars and called it "a smart, soulful and immersive work of art". Eclipsed magazine described the album as "one more shining jewel in the discography of Steven Wilson. Modern, disturbing, brilliant!" Metal Hammer awarded Hand. Cannot. Erase. 6/7 and described it as "another masterpiece". US website FDRMX rated the album 4.8/5 and stated "Hand. Cannot. Erase. grabs your full attention from the beginning to the very final note, and that's the sign of a great album".

All About Jazz awarded Hand. Cannot. Erase. 5 stars and said "As someone capable of delivering accessible music that is, at the same time, compositionally and lyrically deep—detailed and, at times, unapologetically complex—Wilson makes absolutely no compromises in doing what he does". Another 5 star review appeared in the March 2015 edition of Record Collector, who praised the album's "Spellbinding poignancy and aching beauty".

German magazine Visions declared Hand. Cannot. Erase. to be "The Wall for the Facebook generation".

Track listing

Personnel
Adapted from Hand. Cannot. Erase. liner notes.

Band
Steven Wilson – lead vocals, Mellotron (tracks 1–10), keyboards (tracks 1, 2, 4, 6, 7 and 8), guitars (tracks 2–10), bass guitar (tracks 1, 2 and 5–7), banjo (track 7), hammered dulcimer (track 9), programming (tracks 1–5, 9 and 10), shaker (tracks 3, 5 and 6), effects (tracks 1, 2, 4, 5 and 9–11)
Guthrie Govan – guitar (tracks 1, 2, 6, 7, 9 and 10), lead guitar (tracks 5, 7 and 9)
Nick Beggs – bass guitar (tracks 3 and 9), Chapman Stick (tracks 4, 6, 7 and 10), backing vocals (tracks 2, 4–6, 9 and 10)
Adam Holzman – piano (tracks 1–3, 5–7 and 9–11), Hammond organ (tracks 1–3, 5–7, 9 and 10), celesta (tracks 3, 5 and 9), Fender Rhodes (tracks 3, 4, 6 and 9), Wurlitzer (track 7), Moog Voyager synthesizer (track 7)
Marco Minnemann – drums (tracks 2–7 and 9)

Additional musicians
Dave Gregory – guitars (tracks 2, 3 and 10)
Chad Wackerman – drums (track 10)
Ninet Tayeb – vocals (tracks 5 and 9)
Theo Travis – flute and baritone saxophone (track 9)
Katherine Begley – spoken word (track 4)
Leo Blair – solo vocal (track 5)
Schola Cantorum of the Cardinal Vaughan Memorial School – choir (tracks 5, 10 and 11)
London Session Orchestra – strings (tracks 9 and 10)

Production
Steven Wilson – production, composition, arrangements, artwork design
Dave Stewart — arrangements, conducting, transcription
Steve Price – string engineer
Laurence Anslow – engineer
Steve Orchard – engineer
Lasse Hoile — artwork, photography, film director
Hajo Mueller  — illustrations
Carl Glover – design, layout

Charts

References

2015 albums
Steven Wilson albums
Kscope albums
Albums recorded at AIR Studios
Concept albums